Kasbah Mosque may refer to:

 Kasbah Mosque (Marrakesh)
 Kasbah Mosque (Tunis)
 Kasbah Mosque (Tangier)